The mixed doubles tennis event at the 2019 Summer Universiade was held from 9 to 13 July at the Circolo Tennis and Lungomare in Naples, Italy.

Russia's Yana Sizikova and Ivan Gakhov won the gold medal, defeating Czech Republic's Anastasia Zarycká and Dominik Kellovský in the final, 4–6, 6–2, [10–8].

China's Ye Qiuyu and Wu Hao, and France's Alice Robbe and Ronan Joncour won the bronze medals.

Seeds
The top seed received a bye into the second round.

Draw

Finals

Top half

Bottom half

References
Main Draw

Women's doubles